The 2010 CAF Champions League Final was the final of 2010 CAF Champions League. TP Mazembe of the Democratic Republic of the Congo beat Espérance ST from Tunisia 6–1 on aggregate to win their fourth title in the competition, and their second in a row. They also qualified to the quarter-finals for the 2010 FIFA Club World Cup.

Qualified teams
In the following table, finals until 1996 were in the African Cup of Champions Club era, since 1997 were in the CAF Champions League era.

Background
TP Mazembe won the title in 2009, which was their third title overall after winning it 1967 and 1968 when it was called the African Cup of Champions Clubs. Espérance entered the Champions league for the first time since 2005. In 1994 they won their only title so far.
Both teams met in the Group stage, with each victorious in their home matches - Mazembe winning 2–1, while Espérance won 3–0. Both teams qualified for the semifinals on the second-last matchday.
In the semifinals Mazembe defeated the Algerian side (and Group Stage winner) JS Kabylie 3–1 on aggregate, winning the first leg at home by that score, with the second leg ending in a scoreless draw.
Espérance faced Al-Ahly from Egypt and lost the first leg 2–1 away from home.  In need of a win in the second leg, Espérance were victorious 1–0 and reached the final on the away goals rule.

Venues

Frédéric-Kibassa-Maliba Stadium

Stade Frédéric-Kibassa-Maliba, also known as Stade de la Kenya, is a multi-use stadium located in the Kenya suburb of Lubumbashi, Democratic Republic of the Congo.  It is currently used mostly for football matches. It is the current home of FC Saint Eloi Lupopo and the former home venue of TP Mazembe.  The stadium has a capacity of 35,000 people and is named after Frederic Kibassa Maliba, a former Minister of Youth and Sports.

7 November Stadium

7 November Stadium is a multi-purpose stadium in Radès, Tunis, Tunisia about 10 kilometers south-east of the city center of Tunis, in the center of the Olympic City. It is currently used mostly for football matches and it also has facilities for athletics.  The stadium holds 60,000 and was built in 2001 for the 2001 Mediterranean Games  and is considered to be one of the best stadiums in Africa. The stadium was built for the 2001 Mediterranean Games, the 60,000-seat covered area covers 13,000 m2 and consists of a central area, 3 adjoining grounds, 2 warm-up rooms, 2 paintings and an official stand of 7,000 seats. The press gallery is equipped with 300 desks.

Club Africain and ES Tunis play their major league matches here. Before the construction of this stadium, the Tunis derby used to be played in the 45,000 seat-capacity Stade El Menzah. It is also the stadium of Tunisia national football team since 2001.

This stadium has hosted matches of the 2004 African Cup of Nations which was won by the Tunisian team.

Road to the final

Format
The final was decided over two legs, with aggregate goals used to determine the winner. If the sides were level on aggregate after the second leg, the away goals rule would have been applied, and if still level, the tie would have proceeded directly to a penalty shootout (no extra time is played).

Matches

First leg

Second leg

References

External links
 
 CAF Site

2010
Final
TP Mazembe matches
Espérance ST matches
International club association football competitions hosted by the Democratic Republic of the Congo
Sports competitions in Radès
21st century in Radès